The West Palm Beach Expos were a Florida State League minor league baseball team which existed from 1969 through the 1997 season in West Palm Beach, Florida.

History
The West Palm Beach Expos were a Class A affiliate of the Montreal Expos and played their home games at West Palm Beach Municipal Stadium. 

Evolving from the West Palm Beach Indians and directly from the West Palm Beach Braves (1965–1968), they were one of the longest existing Florida State League teams. In 1998, the team moved to nearby Jupiter and became today's Jupiter Hammerheads. 

Baseball Hall of Fame inductees Gary Carter (1972), Vladimir Guerrero (1996–1997), Randy Johnson (1986), Tim Raines (1978) and Larry Walker (1986) played for West Palm Beach.

The 1990 Expos were recognized as one of the 100 greatest minor league teams of all time.

The ballpark
The Expos played at West Palm Beach Municipal Stadium, which was located at 755 Hank Aaron Drive
West Palm Beach, Florida. The stadium was the longtime spring training home of the Atlanta Braves. It was demolished in 2002 and is now the site of retail stores.

Notable alumni

Baseball Hall of Fame alumni
 Gary Carter (1972) Inducted, 2003.
 Vladimir Guerrero (1996-1997) Inducted, 2018.
 Randy Johnson (1986) Inducted, 2015.
 Tim Raines (1978) Inducted, 2017.
 Larry Walker (1986) Inducted, 2020.

Notable alumni
Felipe Alou (MGR, 1977, 1986–1991) 3x MLB All-Star; 1994 NL Manager of the Year
 Dusty Baker (1968) 2x MLB All-Star; 3 x NL Manager of the Year (1993, 1997, 2000)
 Michael Barrett (1997)
 Miguel Batista (1992)
 Tony Bernazard (1975)
 Mike Blowers (1987)
 Geoff Blum (1995)
 Kent Bottenfield (1988) MLB All-Star
 Orlando Cabrera (1995, 1997)
Ivan Calderon (1992) MLB All-Star
 Jamey Carroll (1997)
Norm Charlton (1984-1985) MLB All-Star
Greg Colbrunn (1989, 1993)
 Wil Cordero (1989) MLB All-Star
Wayne Garrett (1967)
Cito Gaston (1965) MLB All-Star; Manager: 2x World Series Champion Toronto Blue Jays (1992, 1993)
John Wetteland (1993) MLB All-Star
Bill Gullickson (1977-1978)
 Cliff Floyd (1992) MLB All-Star

Barry Foote (1971)
Andrés Galarraga (1979, 1982–1983) 5x MLB All-Star; 1993 NL Batting Title

John Hart (1969-1970)

 Jeff Huson (1987)

 Marcel Lachemann (1974)

 Charlie Lea (1987) MLB All-Star

 Dale Murray (1971-1972)

David Palmer (1977-1978, 1981)

Larry Parrish (1973) 2x MLB All-Star

 Tony Phillips (1978-1979)

Ron Reed (1965) MLB All-Star
 Shane Rawley (1975) MLB All-Star
Alberto Reyes (1990)
Gary Roenicke (1974)
Mel Rojas (1988)

Scott Sanderson (1977) MLB All-Star

Dan Schatzeder (1976)

Tony Scott (1970-1971)

 Bryn Smith (1987)

 Matt Stairs (1989-1990)
 Ugueth Urbina (1995-1996) 2x MLB All-Star

 Ellis Valentine (1973) MLB All-Star

 John Vander Wal (1988)
 Jose Vidro (1995) 3x MLB All-Star

Jerry White (1971)
Rondell White (1992, 1996) MLB All-Star
 John Wetteland (1993) 3x MLB All-Star
Earl Williams (1967) 1971 NL Rookie of the Year
 Esteban Yan (1995)

Year-by-year record

References

Defunct Florida State League teams
Baseball teams established in 1969
Sports in West Palm Beach, Florida
Atlanta Braves minor league affiliates
Milwaukee Braves minor league affiliates
Montreal Expos minor league affiliates
Defunct baseball teams in Florida
1969 establishments in Florida
1997 disestablishments in Florida
Baseball teams disestablished in 1997
West Palm Beach, Florida